Isabella McFadden (born August 2, 1995), known online as Internet Girl, is a Canadian social media personality and noted Depop seller of 1990s and 2000s clothing. She sells clothing found at thrift stores as well as new clothing of her own design. Many of her sales come in the form of "style bundles", sets of clothing with matching accessories based upon a particular theme or style. She has become Depop's top seller in the United States, with her account reaching over 660,000 followers.

Early life
McFadden was born in Winnipeg, Manitoba on August 2, 1995. She attended Lawrence Park Collegiate Institute in Toronto, and studied communication and film at Concordia University in Montreal, before dropping out to move to Los Angeles to become a Depop seller.

References

External links
Internet Girl Website

1995 births
Living people

Canadian TikTokers
Glamour models
Instagram accounts
Social media influencers
Canadian women in business
Canadian YouTubers
2010s fashion
2010s in Internet culture
2020s in Internet culture
Youth culture